The University of Zambia Library is the academic library of the University of Zambia (UNZA) in Lusaka, Zambia.  It consists of three specialised libraries: the UNZA Main Library, the School of Veterinary Medicine Library, and the Medical Library. The main library was designated a National Reference Library and is as such open to the general public.

Veterinary Library 
The Veterinary Library also known as Samora Machel Veterinary Library offers more than 10,000 print and electronic resources on veterinary medicine, anatomy, physiology, pathology, microbiology, and parasitology as well as information on practice management, ethics, and animal welfare. The library is available to help meet the information needs of staff and students in the Schools of Veterinary Medicine and Agricultural Sciences.

Medical Library 
The University of Zambia Medical library is located at Ridgeway Campus within the University Teaching Hospital which is the biggest tertiary hospital in Zambia. The role of UNZA Medical Library is to provide access to comprehensive biomedical information resources required by students, faculty members of the Medical school, Hospital staff  and  researchers for learning and teaching and also serve as a national reference library.

References

External links 

 

University of Zambia
Libraries in Zambia
Buildings and structures in Lusaka